In mathematics, an ordinary singularity of an algebraic curve is a singular point of multiplicity r where the r tangents at the point are distinct .
In higher dimensions the literature on algebraic geometry contains many inequivalent definitions of ordinary singular points.

References

Algebraic curves